The Embassy of Turkey in Montevideo (Turkish: Türkiye'nin Montevideo Büyükelçiliği) is the diplomatic mission of Turkey to Uruguay.

References 

Diplomatic missions of Turkey